Top Country Albums is a chart that ranks the top-performing country music albums in the United States, published by Billboard.  In 2015, 23 different albums topped the chart; placings were based on electronic point of sale data from retail outlets.

Luke Bryan was the only act to achieve more than one number one in 2015.  In the spring he spent three weeks in the top spot with Spring Break...Checkin' Out, the last in a series of spring break-themed releases released by Bryan since 2009.  It included five new tracks as well as the six tracks from the 2014 EP Spring Break 6...Like We Ain't Ever.  Bryan returned to the top spot in August with the album Kill the Lights, which spent eight weeks atop the chart, tying for the most weeks spent at number one by an album with Montevallo, the debut album by Sam Hunt.  Bryan's total of 11 weeks at number one was the most achieved by any act during the year and Kill the Lights had the longest unbroken run in the top spot of 2015 with its initial spell of five weeks in the peak position.

Several acts topped the chart for the first time in 2015, beginning with the band Blackberry Smoke in the issue of Billboard dated February 28.  The following week Aaron Watson entered the chart at number one with The Underdog.  It gave the singer his first chart-topper more than ten years after he released his debut album, and was the first self-released and independently distributed album by a male soloist to enter at number one in the chart's history.  In July, Easton Corbin reached the top of the chart for the first time with About to Get Real, and the following month Something More Than Free was the first number one for Jason Isbell.  In the fall, Brett Eldredge, Chris Stapleton and Chris Young made their first appearances in the top spot with Illinois, Traveller and I'm Comin' Over respectively.  In contrast to the various acts topping the chart for the first time, George Strait gained his 26th number one with Cold Beer Conversation, and country music veterans Willie Nelson and Merle Haggard, both of whom had been achieving number ones for more than 40 years, spent a week in the top spot with the collaborative album Django and Jimmie; Haggard would die less than a year later, in April of the following year.

Chart history

See also
2015 in music
List of number-one country singles of 2015 (U.S.)

References

2015
United States Country Albums